Shrirasthu Shubhamasthu is a 2000 Indian Kannada-language romantic drama film directed by Seetharam Karanth and produced by N. K. Prakash Babu. The film stars Ramesh Aravind, Anu Prabhakar along with Naveen Krishna and Srinivasa Murthy in other prominent roles. The film had a musical score and soundtrack composed and written by K. Kalyan.

The film received mixed response upon release. Actor Srinivasa Murthy won the Karnataka State Film Award for Best Supporting Actor for his performance.

Cast 
 Ramesh Aravind as Karthik
 Anu Prabhakar as Sapna
 Srinivasa Murthy as Ramchandra
 Naveen Krishna as Harichandra
 Chitra Shenoy
 Vaishali Kasaravalli as Karthik's Mother
 Nagesh Mayya
 M. N. Suresh
 Mandeep Roy as Ram bhatta
 Krishne Gowda
 Vanishree as Karthik's Sister
Deepa Bhaskar (Child Artist)
 Bindhushree  (Child Artist)

Soundtrack 
The music of the film was composed and written by K. Kalyan.

References

External links 
Movie preview

2000 films
2000s Kannada-language films
Indian romantic drama films
2000 romantic drama films
Films scored by K. Kalyan